Lake Waiporohita is a dune lake in the Northland Region of New Zealand. It is located near Tokerau Beach on the Karikari Peninsula.

The small lake has no inflows or outflows. The lake catchment is primarily fenced pasture, with some Manuka scrub and Pohutukawa.

The lake is monitored by Northland Regional Council, and the environmental information can be viewed on the LAWA website.

See also
List of lakes in New Zealand

References

Waiporohita
Far North District